Ben Chonzie or Ben-y-Hone ('mountain of the narrowness', or possibly from Beinn Chòinnich, 'mossy mountain') is a mountain in the Breadalbane region of the Scottish Highlands. It is eleven kilometres northwest of Crieff. It is the highest point of a large area of moorland and rounded hills between Loch Earn and Loch Tay, and with a broad, flat summit and relatively few distinguishing features, it is often regarded as one of Scotland's least interesting Munros. 

It is most often climbed from Invergeldie (Comrie) to the southwest; however it can also be climbed from the southeast by way of Glen Turret. The latter is longer but presents walkers with a more interesting and scenic climb, having an array of buttresses and cliffs which can be tackled by those who feel brave, or passed by on either side. Mountain hares (Lepus timidus, subspecies Lepus timidus scoticus) can be seen around the plateau area if walkers are quiet and observant.  There are also many other animals on the approaches to the Ben, including Buzzards, other birds of prey, and frogs and newts in the pools alongside the landrover track that runs up the eastern aspect of the loch.  Deer may be seen on the slopes to the north of the Ben.

References 

Munros
Marilyns of Scotland
Mountains and hills of the Southern Highlands
Sites of Special Scientific Interest in Scotland
Mountains and hills of Perth and Kinross